The Mexico City Metrobús Line 7 is a bus rapid transit line in the Mexico City Metrobús. It operates between Campo Marte in the Miguel Hidalgo borough and Indios Verdes, in Gustavo A. Madero in the northern part of the city. This is the newest line, inaugurated in March 2018.

The line, known as Corredor Reforma, runs through Paseo de la Reforma, Calzada de los Misterios and Prolongación de los Misterios.

Line 7 was inaugurated by Miguel Ángel Mancera, Head of Government of the Federal District from 2012 to 2018. The line had a cost of 2.8 billion pesos.

The line has 31 stations and a total length of 15 kilometers. Low floor, double-decker buses for this line were produced by Alexander Dennis and are of type Enviro500 MMC.

Service description

Services
The line has seven itineraries.

Indios Verdes to Campo Marte
To Campo Marte
First Bus: 4:30 (Monday-Friday)
Last Bus: 00:00 (Monday-Friday)
First Bus: 4:30 (Saturday)
Last Bus: 00:00 (Saturday)
First Bus: 5:00 (Sunday)
Last Bus: 6:00 (Sunday)

To Indios Verdes
First Bus: 5:05 (Monday-Friday)
Last Bus: 00:45 (Monday-Friday)
First Bus: 5:55 (Saturday)
Last Bus: 00:45 (Saturday)
First Bus: 5:45 (Sunday)
Last Bus: 6:20 (Sunday)

Hospital Infantil La Villa to Campo Marte
To Campo Marte
First Bus: 5:10 (Monday-Friday)
Last Bus: 21:30 (Monday-Friday)
First Bus: 5:05 (Saturday)
Last Bus: 21:30 (Saturday)
No service on Sunday

From Campo Marte
First Bus: 5:55 (Monday-Friday)
Last Bus: 22:15 (Monday-Friday)
First Bus: 5:55 (Saturday)
Last Bus: 22:15 (Saturday)
No service on Sunday

Glorieta Cuitláhuac to Campo Marte
To Campo Marte
First Bus: 7:00 (Monday-Friday)
Last Bus: 20:30 (Monday-Friday)
No service on Saturday and Sunday

From Campo Marte
First Bus: 7:25 (Monday-Friday)
Last Bus: 21:00 (Monday-Friday)
No service on Saturday and Sunday

Indios Verdes to La Diana
From Indios Verdes
No service from Monday to Saturday
First Bus: 6:05 (Sunday)
Last Bus: 13:15 (Sunday)

To Indios Verdes
No service from Monday to Saturday
First Bus: 6:45 (Sunday)
Last Bus: 13:55 (Sunday)

Indios Verdes to Campo Marte
To Campo Marte
No service from Monday to Saturday
First Bus: 13:25 (Sunday)
Last Bus: 00:00 (Sunday)

To Indios Verdes
No service from Monday to Saturday
First Bus: 14:15 (Sunday)
Last Bus: 00:45 (Sunday)

Hospital Infantil La Villa to La Diana
To La Diana
No service from Monday to Saturday
First Bus: 6:15 (Sunday)
Last Bus: 13:15 (Sunday)

To Hospital Infantil La Villa
No service from Monday to Saturday
First Bus: 6:50 (Sunday)
Last Bus: 13:55 (Sunday)

Hospital Infantil La Villa to Campo Marte
To Campo Marte
No service from Monday to Saturday
First Bus: 13:25 (Sunday)
Last Bus: 21:30 (Sunday)

From Campo Marte
No service from Monday to Saturday
First Bus: 14:10 (Sunday)
Last Bus: 22:15 (Sunday)

The line 7 services the Miguel Hidalgo, Cuauhtémoc and Gustavo A. Madero boroughs.

Station list

{| class="wikitable"
|-
! width="150px" | Stations
! Connections
! Neighborhood(s) 
! Borough
! Picture
! Date opened
|-
|  Campo Marte
| 

 Routes: 76, 76-A
 Routes: 8-B, 8-C, 8-D, 18-D
| rowspan=4| Polanco
| rowspan=4| Miguel Hidalgo
| 
| rowspan=31| March 5, 2018
|-
|  Auditorio
| 

  Line 7: Auditorio station
 Routes: 76, 76-A, 300-A
 Routes: 8-B, 8-C, 8-D, 18-D
| 
|-
|  Antropología
|

 Routes: 8-B, 8-C, 8-D, 18-D
| 
|-
|  Gandhi
|

 Routes: 8-B, 8-C, 8-D, 18-D
| 
|-
|  Chapultepec
|
 Chapultepec (at distance)

  Line 1: Chapultepec station (both at distance)
 Routes: 11-A, 13-A, 34-A, 115-A, 200 (all at distance)
 Lines 2 and 6: Chapultepec stop (at distance)
 Routes: 7-D, 8-A, 8-B, 8-C, 8-D, 13-C, 13-E, 18-C, 18-D, 19-E, 19-F, 19-G, 19-H, 21-A (all at distance)
| rowspan=5| Colonia Cuauhtémoc, Juárez
| rowspan=16| Cuauhtémoc
| 
|-
|  La Diana
|

 Routes: 19, 19-A
| 
|-
|  El Ángel
|

 Routes: 19, 19-A
| 
|-
|  La Palma
|

| 
|-
|  Hamburgo
|

  Line 1:  Hamburgo station
| 
|-
|  Reforma
| 

  Line 1:  Reforma station
 (at distance)
 Route: 19-H (at distance)
| rowspan=2| Tabacalera, Juárez
| 
|-
|  París
| 
  Line 1:  Reforma station
| 
|-
|  Glorieta de Colón
| 

  Line 4: Glorieta de Colón station (south route)
 Route: 19-H
| Tabacalera, Centro
| 
|-
|  El Caballito
| 

  Line 3:  Hidalgo station
  Line 4: Hidalgo station (north route)
| Tabacalera, Centro
| 
|-
|  Hidalgo
| 
<li>  Line 3: Hidalgo station
<li>  Line 4: Hidalgo station (north route)
<li> (at distance)
<li>  Line 2: Hidalgo station
<li>  Line 3: Hidalgo station
<li> Route: 27-A
<li> Line 5: Metro Hidalgo stop
<li> Route: 16-A
| Guerrero, Centro
| 
|-
|  Glorieta Violeta
| 
<li> Route: 27-A
<li> Line 5: Lerdo stop
| Guerrero
| 
|-
|  Garibaldi
| 
<li>  Line 8: Garibaldi / Lagunilla station
<li>  Line B: Garibaldi / Lagunilla station
<li> Routes: 18, 27-A
<li> Line 5: Garibaldi stop
<li> Routes: 10-E, 11-C
| Guerrero, Centro
| 
|-
|  Glorieta Cuitláhuac
| 
<li> Route: 18
<li> Line 5: Av. Ricardo Flores Magón stop
| Guerrero, Morelos
| 
|-
|  Tres Culturas
| 
<li> Line 5: Constancia / Tlatelolco stops
| Tlatelolco, Morelos
| 
|-
|  Peralvillo
| 
<li> Line 5: Canal del Norte / Manuel González stops
<li> Route: 10-B
| Ex Hipódromo de Peralvillo, Morelos
| 
|-
|  Mercado Beethoven
| 
<li> Line 5: Juventino Rosas stop
<li> Route: 20-B
| Peralvillo
| 
|-
|  Misterios
| 
<li>  Line 5: Misterios station (at distance)
<li> Route: 200
<li> Line 5: Río Consulado stop (at distance)
<li> Route: 20-A
| Peralvillo, Vallejo
| Gustavo A. Madero / Cuauhtémoc
| 
|-
|  Clave
|
<li> Line 5: Donizetti stop
| rowspan=2| Vallejo
| rowspan=10| Gustavo A. Madero,
| 
|-
|  Robles Domínguez
|
<li> Routes: 11-A, 12
<li> Line 4: Calzada de los Misterios stop
<li> Line 5: Robles Domínguez stop
| 
|-
|  Excélsior
|
<li> Line 5: Excélsior stop
| rowspan=3| Colonia Industrial
| 
|-
|  Necaxa
|
<li> Line 5: Victoria stop (at distance)
| 
|-
|  Avenida Talismán
|
<li> Line 5: Euzkaro stop
<li> Routes: 10-A, 10-B, 10-C
| 
|-
|  Garrido
|
<li>  Line 6: La Villa-Basílica station (at distance)
<li> Line 5: Garrido stop
| Tepeyac Insurgentes
| 
|-
|  Delegación Gustavo A. Madero
| 
<li>  Line 6: Delegación Gustavo A. Madero station
<li> Routes: 107-B
<li> Line 5: Cuauhtémoc stop
| Villa Gustavo A. Madero
| 
|-
|  Hospital Infantil La Villa
| 
<li>  Line 6: Hospital Infantil La Villa station
<li> Routes: 101-A, 101-B, 101-D, 107-B
<li> Line 5: Hospital de la Villa stop
| Villa Gustavo A. Madero, Estanzuela
| 
|-
|  De los Misterios
| <li>  Line 6: De los Misterios station
<li> Routes: 101-A, 101-B, 101-D, 107-B
<li> Line 5: Av. Montevideo stop
| Tepeyac Insurgentes, Villa Gustavo A. Madero

| 
|-
|  Indios Verdes
|
<li> : Line 1: Indios Verdes station
<li> : Line 3: Indios Verdes station
<li> : Line 1: Indios Verdes station
<li> Indios Verdes
<li>  Line 3: Indios Verdes station
<li>  Line IV: Indios Verdes station
<li> Line 2: Indios Verdes station (under construction)
<li> Routes: 101, 101-A, 101-B, 101-D, 102, 107-B (at distance), 108
| Residencial Zacatenco
| 
|}

Operators
Operadora Línea 7, SA de CV (OL7)
Sky Bus Reforma, SA de CV (SBR)

Ridership
As of March 2018, it is estimated that 130,000 passengers use Line 7 every day.

Incidents
On March 9, 2018 a Metrobus unit crashed against a car, when the car driver turned left without noticing that the bus was coming towards the car.

Notes

References

2018 establishments in Mexico
7
Bus rapid transit in Mexico
Paseo de la Reforma